"Fire in the Head" is a song by Canadian rock band The Tea Party. It was released as a single in Australia and a promotional single in Canada, the UK and the USA. The music video, directed by Dean Karr, was shot in Los Angeles while the band were recording The Edges of Twilight.

"Fire in the Head" is a standard three-piece rock composition and features a broken mellotron, it was written during the band's first cross Canada tour with Roy and Nick Harper with Jeff Martin intending to use the song on Roy Harper's next album until the band jammed it with loud drums, bass and guitar. Lyrically it is influenced by Tom Cowan's book "Fire in the Head".

Track listing
"Fire in the Head (edit)"
"Fire in the Head"
"Inanna"
"Drawing Down the Moon"

Charts

References

1995 singles
The Tea Party songs
Song recordings produced by Ed Stasium
1995 songs